Abul-Mahāsin Abu Bakr Zaynuddin Azraqi was an 11th-century poet who lived in Iran.

Firdowsi is said to have taken refuge in Azraqi's father's house (Ismail Varrāq, "the book seller") on his flight from Ghazneh to Tus.

Born in Herat, Azraqi was an eminent panegyrist. He turned Alfiyya va Shalfiyya into poetry, and is said to have presented himself to Shamsudowleh Abolfavāris Tughan-Shah, son of Alp Arslan. He also wrote a version of the Sandbad nama. Except for his qasidahs, none of the aforementioned works remain.

He died in 1072 CE.

References
 Jan Rypka, History of Iranian Literature. Reidel Publishing Company. ASIN B-000-6BXVT-K
AZRAQĪ HERAVĪ in the Encyclopedia Iranica

See also

List of Persian poets and authors
Persian literature

1072 deaths
11th-century Persian-language poets
11th-century writers
Year of birth unknown
11th-century Iranian people